Queenstown is a resort town in Otago in the south-west of New Zealand's South Island. It has an urban population of 

The town is built around an inlet called Queenstown Bay on Lake Wakatipu, a long, thin, Z-shaped lake formed by glacial processes, and has views of nearby mountains such as The Remarkables, Cecil Peak, Walter Peak and just above the town, Ben Lomond and Queenstown Hill.

The Queenstown-Lakes District has a land area of  not counting its inland lakes Hāwea, Wakatipu, and Wānaka. The region has an estimated resident population of  Neighbouring towns include Arrowtown, Glenorchy, Kingston, Wānaka, Alexandra, and Cromwell. The nearest cities are Dunedin and Invercargill. Queenstown is known for its commerce-oriented tourism, especially adventure and ski tourism.

History

Māori settlement and presence
The area was discovered and first settled by Māori. Kāi Tahu say that the lake was dug by the Waitaha  ancestor, Rākaihautū, with his kō (digging stick) named Tūwhakaroria. After arriving at Whakatū Nelson in the waka Uruao, Rākaihautū divided his crew into two. He led one group through the interior of Te Waipounamu, digging the freshwater lakes of the island. After digging the lakes Hāwea, Wānaka, and Whakatipu Waimāori, he travelled through the Greenstone and Hollyford valleys before finally digging Whakatipu Waitai (Lake McKerrow).

The first non-Māori to see Lake Wakatipu was European Nathanael Chalmers who was guided by Reko, the chief of the Tuturau, over the Waimea Plains and up the Mataura River in September 1853. Evidence of stake nets, baskets for catching eels, spears and ashes indicated the Glenorchy area was visited by Māori. It is likely Ngāi Tahu Māori visited Queenstown en route to collect Pounamu (greenstone). A settlement called Te Kirikiri Pa was occupied by the tribe of Kāti Māmoe which was situated where the Queenstown Gardens are today, but by the time European migrants arrived in the 1860s this settlement was no longer being used.

European settlement c. 1860
European explorers William Gilbert Rees and Nicholas von Tunzelmann were the first non-Māori to settle the area. Rees established a high country farm in the location of Queenstown's current town centre in 1860, but the discovery of gold in the Arrow River in 1862 encouraged Rees to convert his wool shed into a hotel named the Queen's Arms, now known as Eichardt's.

Many Queenstown streets bear names from the gold mining era (such as Camp Street) and some historic buildings remain. William's Cottage, the Lake Lodge of Ophir (now Artbay Gallery), Queenstown Police Station, and St Peter's Anglican Church lie close together in a designated historic precinct.

Naming
Tāhuna, the te reo name for Queenstown, means "shallow bay".

There are various apocryphal accounts of how Queenstown gained its name, of which the following appears to be the most likely: "When William Rees first arrived in the area and built his homestead, the area was known as The Station although miners soon referred to it as The Camp from 1860 to 1862. The miners, and especially the Irish, had taken an interest in the ceremony held for a town called Cobh in Ireland (then part of the United Kingdom) which was renamed Queenstown in honour of Queen Victoria in 1850.

There was then a public meeting to name the township on the lake in January 1863 (probably the weekend of the 3rd and 4th) in which the town was officially given the name of Queenstown in reference to Ireland's Queenstown. By 9–10 January 1863, the town was being reported with the name of Queenstown in several reports written by a correspondent in the Otago Witness on 5 and 6 January.

Geography
Queenstown is situated on the shore of Lake Wakatipu, the third largest lake by surface area in New Zealand. The town is located close to the lake's northeastern bend, at which point a small arm, the Frankton Arm, joins the lake with its principal outflow, the Kawarau River. The centre of the town is on the north shore at the point where the Frankton Arm links with the main body of the lake, but also extends to the major suburb of Frankton at the eastern end of the arm, and across to Kelvin Heights on the Kelvin Peninsula, which forms the Frankton Arm's southern shore.

Below the lake lies the deep Kawarau Gorge, and there are nearby plains suitable for agriculture and viticulture. Queenstown lies close to the heart of the Central Otago wine region.

Suburbs
Central Queenstown contains many businesses, apartments and homes but is near many suburbs or large areas of housing: Fernhill, Sunshine Bay, Queenstown Hill, Goldfield Heights, Marina Heights, Kelvin Heights, Arthurs Point and Frankton.

Just outside Queenstown are the areas of: Arrowtown, Closeburn, Dalefield, Gibbston, Jack's Point, Hanley's Farm, Hayes Creek, Lake Hayes Estate, Shotover Country and Quail Rise.

Climate
Because of its relatively moderate altitude (310 metres) and high mountain surroundings, Queenstown has an oceanic climate (Köppen climate classification Cfb). Summer has long warm days with temperatures that can reach 30 °C while winters are cold with temperatures often in single digits with frequent snowfall, although there is no permanent snow cover during the year. As with the rest of Central Otago, Queenstown lies within the rain shadow of the Southern Alps, but being closer to the west coast the town is more susceptible to rain-bearing fronts than nearby Cromwell, Wānaka and Alexandra.

Demography
It had an urban population of  making it the 35th-largest urban area in New Zealand. In 2016, Queenstown overtook Oamaru to become the second-largest urban area in Otago, behind Dunedin. The Queenstown urban area as defined by Statistics New Zealand doesn't include Lake Hayes or Arthurs Point, which are contiguous with Queenstown but are designated as separate urban areas.

The Queenstown urban area had a population of 13,539 at the 2018 New Zealand census, an increase of 2,205 people (19.5%) since the 2013 census, and an increase of 3,111 people (29.8%) since the 2006 census. There were 4,254 households. There were 7,089 males and 6,447 females, giving a sex ratio of 1.1 males per female, with 1,341 people (9.9%) aged under 15 years, 4,887 (36.1%) aged 15 to 29, 6,264 (46.3%) aged 30 to 64, and 1,041 (7.7%) aged 65 or older.

Ethnicities were 71.2% European/Pākehā, 4.5% Māori, 1.2% Pacific peoples, 17.8% Asian, and 10.5% other ethnicities (totals add to more than 100% since people could identify with multiple ethnicities).

The proportion of people born overseas was 58.3%, compared with 27.1% nationally.

Although some people objected to giving their religion, 58.5% had no religion, 29.1% were Christian, 2.8% were Hindu, 0.6% were Muslim, 1.7% were Buddhist and 3.4% had other religions.

Of those at least 15 years old, 3,234 (26.5%) people had a bachelor or higher degree, and 759 (6.2%) people had no formal qualifications. 1,692 people (13.9%) earned over $70,000 compared to 17.2% nationally. The employment status of those at least 15 was that 9,165 (75.1%) people were employed full-time, 1,263 (10.4%) were part-time, and 138 (1.1%) were unemployed.

Economy

Growth and affordability
Residential housing in the Queenstown area is expensive due to factors such as the town being a tourist destination, its lack of land and its desirability to foreigners and investors. Queenstown is rated the least affordable place in New Zealand to buy a property, overtaking Auckland at the start of 2017.
In December 2016 the average house price in the Queenstown area rose to $1 million NZD.

Employment
The area’s growth rate is one of the fastest in the country with the population growing 7.1% from 2015 to 2016 in a 12-month period. Most jobs in Queenstown are tourism- or accommodation-related. Employment growth was also the highest of any area in New Zealand at 10.3% in the March 2016 year.

Retail

Queenstown has a tourist-focused shopping area, centred around the Queenstown Mall. The public pedestrian street opened in 1990, and includes Reading Cinemas.

O'Connells Shopping Centre also opened in 1990, and is due to undergo an upgrade in 2021.

In 1986, Queenstown was granted an exemption to allow shops to open every day of the year except Christmas Day, Easter Sunday and before 12 noon on Anzac Day (at the time, shops in New Zealand were required to close on Sundays and public holidays). The exemption was extended in 1990 allow shops to open on Easter Sunday. The exemption applies to all shops in a  radius of the intersection of Camp Street and Ballarat Street in central Queenstown, and makes Queenstown and the Lake Wakatipu basin one of only three areas in New Zealand where shops may open on Good Friday (the other two are Picton and Paihia).

Government

Local
Queenstown lies in the Queenstown-Lakes District territorial authority. It is also part of the Otago region, administered by the Otago Regional Council.

National

For the New Zealand Parliament, Queenstown is covered by one general electorate, Southland, and one Maori electorate, Te Tai Tonga. As of the 2020 general election, Southland is represented by Joseph Mooney (National) and Te Tai Tonga is represented by Rino Tirikatene (Labour).

Tourism

 
A resort town, Queenstown boasted 220 adventure tourism activities in 2012. Skiing and snowboarding, jet boating, whitewater rafting, bungy jumping, mountain biking, skateboarding, tramping, paragliding, sky diving and fly fishing are all popular.

Queenstown is a major centre for snow sports in New Zealand, with people from all over the country and many parts of the world travelling to ski at the four main mountain ski fields (Cardrona Alpine Resort, Coronet Peak, The Remarkables and Treble Cone). Cross country skiing is also available at the Waiorau Snowfarm, near Cardrona village.

The 100-year-old twin screw coal fired steamer TSS Earnslaw traverses Lake Wakatipu.

Queenstown lies close to the centre of a small wine producing region, reputed to be the world's southernmost. The Two Paddocks vineyard is owned by internationally known local actor Sam Neill. Neighbouring, historic Arrowtown features restaurants and bars.

Other tourist activities include:
 Ben Lomond, a nearby mountain for a view of the area
 The gondola known as Skyline Queenstown ascends Bob's Peak on Ben Lomond
 Kiwi Birdlife Park and Paradise for the paradise duck (Tadorna variegata)
 Walk, mountain bike, or run The Queenstown Trail
 Skippers Road
 Scenic flights
 Cecil Peak Station, on the western shore of Lake Wakatipu, a 34,000-acre working sheep and beef farm.

Culture
Festivals
Queenstown has many festivals. Examples include the Bike Festival (March/April), Winter Festival (June), Jazz Festival (October), and Winter Pride (September) which is the largest winter pride event in the Southern Hemisphere.

Locations for television and film
Jane Campion's six-part drama mystery Top of the Lake was shot during 2012 for pay TV release in 2013. The lakes of the Wakatipu appear ominous, and the Southern Alps spectacular. The main location is Moke Lake and scenes were shot on Lower Beach Street and Coronation Drive, and at a supermarket and bottle store on Shotover Street.

In 2010, Cycle 14 of America's Next Top Model, was, in part filmed in Queenstown and was as won by Krista White. Raina Hein was runner-up.

Queenstown and the surrounding area contain many locations used in the filming of The Lord of the Rings film trilogy. Locations used include Paradise near Glenorchy, at the head of Lake Wakatipu.

Queenstown became popular in South Asia after the release of Bollywood blockbuster Kaho Naa... Pyaar Hai, which was partially shot there. Starring sensational debuts by Hrithik Roshan & Amisha Patel it was this film that opened the doors for both tourists and filmmakers from India to New Zealand with Queenstown being the most sought-after destination. Queenstown featured for 17 minutes in I Hate Luv Storys, a 2010 Bollywood romantic comedy. Queenstown and the surrounding areas were also used in the 2009 X-Men Origins: Wolverine film. Mee-Shee: The Water Giant was shot in Queenstown in 2005, and released to DVD in the same year. Queenstown was also used to film most of the 1988 The Rescue. Queenstown was the base for filming the George Lucas 1988 fantasy film Willow.

Filming of the 1981 film Race for the Yankee Zephyr took place in and around Queenstown, the first major motion picture production for the area.

A 1989 TV Commercial for the Toyota Hilux starring Barry Crump and Lloyd Scott in which the two drive off the cliff was filmed at nearby Queenstown Hill.

The first and last episodes of the fifth season of The Mole were filmed in Queenstown.

The 2017 Filipino drama film Northern Lights was shot entirely on location in Queenstown substituting for the setting of Alaska.

In 2017 the Korean variety show Running Man shot an episode in Queenstown, where Haha and Yang-Se Chan took a penalty at the Nevis Swing.

The 2020 crime drama One Lane Bridge'' was filmed in Queenstown. The series focuses on events that take place at a bridge over the Dart River / Te Awa Whakatipu.

Sports and recreation

 Queenstown Events Centre and stadium
 Paragliding or Hang Gliding
 Aerobatics with the Wakatipu Aero Club at Queenstown Airport at Frankton
 Golf at Millbrook Resort, Jack's Point, or Queenstown Golf Club
 Disc golf at the Queenstown Gardens
 Tennis at the Queenstown Tennis Club in Queenstown Gardens
 Cricket at the Queenstown Cricket Club
 Netball at the Wakatipu Netball Centre
 Rugby league and Rugby union at the Wakatipu Rugby League Club Memorial Park
 Touch rugby during the summer season
 Scuba diving or snorkeling in a river, bridge wreck, or in Lake Wakatipu
 Adventure sport, canyon-swing, parachute, jetboat, bungy jump, river-surf, or kitesurf

In the area

 Central Otago region
 Central Otago wine region
 History of the Central Otago Gold Rush
 Milford Road, Milford Sound / Homer Tunnel, the Fiordland Lakes / Doubtful Sound
 Tramping track near Glenorchy
 Routeburn, one of the New Zealand Great Walks

Education

Primary schools

There are also two primary schools in Frankton and a school in Shotover Country.

Secondary schools

Wakatipu High School, a state secondary school for Year 9 to 13 students, is located in Frankton.

Tertiary education

Southern Institute of Technology (SIT), based in Invercargill, has a campus in Queenstown.

Queenstown Resort College is a tertiary education provider focussing on tourism. The college actively supports events for international travel agents.

ACE Wakatipu has a community focus, and provides links to many adult training opportunities.

Churches

Saint Andrew's church 
Saint Andrew's Presbyterian church was completed in 1968 to replace the previous church which was sold and demolished to reuse the land. The church is designed to seat 350 parishioners. The Presbyterian church has been active in the Wakatipu area since 1865.

Saint Peter's church 
Saint Peter's Anglican church was built in 1932 for a cost of 2862 pounds, it was consecrated on 23 November 1932. It replaced the previous wooden church which was built in 1863.

Saint Joseph's church 
Saint Joseph's Catholic church was built in 1898, it replaced the first catholic church built in Queenstown in 1863.  It is built from schist sourced from Arthur's Point. Built in the Gothic Revival style, it was designed by the architect Francis WIlliam Petre. It is a category two historic place.

Infrastructure

Transport 
Queenstown is accessible by road and air but not by rail (similar to Kaitaia, Taupo and Nelson).

As a resort centre, many bus services operate into Queenstown, mostly for package tours, but daily services for locals and others are available to and from Invercargill, Dunedin and Christchurch, the main cities closest to Queenstown. Bee Cards are to replace GoCards on local buses on 15 September 2020.

Queenstown Airport takes flights from Australia by airlines Air New Zealand, Qantas, Virgin Australia and Jetstar and has destinations that include Brisbane, Gold Coast, Melbourne and Sydney (the frequency is much increased over the ski season and during summer). Domestic flights fly to Auckland, Christchurch and Wellington. Queenstown Airport is New Zealand's busiest helicopter base, also the fourth-busiest airport by passenger traffic, and is also heavily used for tourist 'flightseeing', especially to Milford Sound / Piopiotahi and Aoraki / Mount Cook, using both fixed-wing and rotary-wing aircraft.

The primary road access to the Queenstown area is via  (SH6), from Cromwell through the Kawarau Gorge to Frankton, where a 9 km spur (SH6A) leads to the CBD and connects with the Glenorchy Road. SH6 continues south, crossing the Kawarau river before heading down the eastern side of Lake Wakatipu to Kingston before crossing the provincial boundary and emerging on the plains of Southland, terminating in the city of Invercargill. A difficult road over the Crown Range leads to Cardrona skifield and Wānaka, and is New Zealand's highest paved public road pass.

Queenstown is the departure point for a large number of bus day trips to Milford Sound, which entails a return trip of approximately 12 hours. There are scenic flights available to and from Milford Sound. A return flight, including a two-hour cruise, is approximately four hours.

Utilities 
Electricity distribution in Queenstown is the responsibility of two companies, Dunedin-based Aurora Energy and Invercargill-based Powernet. Electricity is supplied from Transpower's national grid at its substation in Frankton, which in turn is fed by a twin-circuit 110,000-volt line from Transpower's Cromwell substation.

Queenstown was one of the last towns in New Zealand with a manual telephone exchange, whereby all calls had to be connected by an operator. The town was upgraded to a fully automatic exchange in 1988. Fibre to the premises was rolled-out in Queenstown as part of the Fifth National Government's Ultra-Fast Broadband programme, with the rollout completed in July 2016.

Notable people
Sam Neill (born 1947), actor, has a home in Queenstown
Tim Bevan (born 1957), film producer, was born in Queenstown
Jaime Passier-Armstrong (born 1981), actress, was born in Queenstown
Jane Taylor, lawyer and current Chair of New Zealand Post, lives in Queenstown
Kim Dotcom, internet entrepreneur

Sister cities
  Aspen, Colorado, United States
  Hangzhou, Zhejiang
 Hikimi, Shimane (now a part of Masuda), Japan

See also
 Tourism in New Zealand

Bibliography

References

External links

 Queenstown Lakes District Council
 Queenstown Tourism official site
 

 
Populated places in Otago
1863 establishments in New Zealand
Populated places established in 1863
Populated places on Lake Wakatipu